Baffier is a surname. Notable people with the surname include:

Dominique Baffier, French archaeologist and prehistorian
Jean Baffier (1851–1920), French sculptor

French-language surnames